Korporatsioon Revelia (also Korp! Revelia) is an all-male fraternity in Estonia. It was founded in 1920.

References

External links

1920 establishments in Estonia
Organizations established in 1920